Open Fire is a 1989 American action film starring David Carradine. He co stars with his daughter Kansas.

References

External links
Open Fire at IMDb
Open Fire at Letterbox DVD
1989 films